Stara Kiszewa  is a village in Kościerzyna County, Pomeranian Voivodeship, in northern Poland. It is the seat of the gmina (administrative district) called Gmina Stara Kiszewa. It is located within the historic region of Pomerania.

The village has a population of 1,480.

Stara Kiszewa was a royal village of the Polish Crown, administratively located in the Tczew County in the Pomeranian Voivodeship.

During the German occupation of Poland (World War II), on November 19, 1939, the Germans murdered 12 Polish farmers from Stara Kiszewa in a massacre in the nearby village Nowy Wiec. Poles were also subjected to expulsions, carried out in late 1939 and January 1940 and in 1942.

References

Villages in Kościerzyna County